Saleh Al-Qumayzi (born 30 October 1991) simply as Saleh Al-Qumayzi, is a Saudi Arabian football player who currently plays for Al-Faisaly as a right back .

Honours

External links
 

Living people
1991 births
Saudi Arabian footballers
Al-Shabab FC (Riyadh) players
Ittihad FC players
Ettifaq FC players
Al-Faisaly FC players
Sportspeople from Riyadh
Saudi Professional League players
Saudi First Division League players
Association football fullbacks